Ore City is a city in Upshur County, Texas, United States. The population was 1,108 at the 2020 census.

Geography

Ore City is located at  (32.800770, –94.717446). It is situated about 13 miles northeast of Gilmer at the junction of U.S. Highway 259 and FM 450.

According to the United States Census Bureau, the city has a total area of 2.3 mi2 (5.9 km2), of which 2.3 mi2 (5.9 km2) of it are land and 0.04 mi2 (0.1 km2) of it (0.88%) is covered by water.

History
Originally part of the William Murray League, the area was first settled in the early 1850s by a group from Haywood County, Tennessee. They immediately started The Murray League Methodist Episcopal Church, South as well as the Murray League Institute. After the Civil War, rich iron ore deposits were discovered in the area and ore was mined sporadically from the 1860s through 1900.

Around 1910, a commercial company led by Colonel L.P. Featherstone was formed to mine ore in the area. He persuaded the Santa Fe line to finance a rail link with Port Bolivar. Land for a new city was purchased and platted into streets and lots around 1911. The town was given the name Ore City and a post office was established soon after. By 1914, 30 miles of the line known as the Port Bolivar Iron Ore Railway had been built, connecting Ore City with Longview. The newly founded community had an estimated population of 400. Further construction on the railroad line was halted by the outbreak of World War I. Colonel Featherstone's company went into bankruptcy and the rail line was abandoned in 1927. Ore City survived and by 1936, around 500 people lived in the community. During World War II, the federal government built a steel plant 10 miles north of Ore City to mine the same ore that previously brought Colonel Featherstone to the area. The plant was completed just as the war ended and was sold to a Texas group as surplus property. They operated it as the Lone Star Steel Company.

Ore City was incorporated in the early 1950s. At that time, the number of residents had fallen to 385. Growth resumed in the mid-1960s and by 1976, Ore City had a population of 900, with 34 businesses operating in the city. More than 1,000 people lived in the city by 2000.

Demographics

As of the 2020 United States census, there were 1,108 people, 350 households, and 252 families residing in the city.

As of the census of 2000,  1,106 people, 403 households, and 295 families resided in the city. The population density was 490.4 people per square mile (189.0/km). The 432 housing units averaged 191.5 per square mile (73.8/km). The racial makeup of the city was 85.35% White, 6.60% African American, 1.54% Native American, 0.90% Asian, 3.44% from other races, and 2.17% from two or more races. Hispanics or Latinos of any race were 7.41% of the population.

Of the 403 households, 37.2% had children under the age of 18 living with them, 57.3% were married couples living together, 13.4% had a female householder with no husband present, and 26.6% were not families. About 22.6% of all households were made up of individuals, and 10.9% had someone living alone who was 65 years of age or older. The average household size was 2.74 and the average family size was 3.23.

In the city, the population was distributed as 31.8% under the age of 18, 8.7% from 18 to 24, 28.0% from 25 to 44, 18.1% from 45 to 64, and 13.4% who were 65 years of age or older. The median age was 32 years. For every 100 females, there were 89.1 males. For every 100 females age 18 and over, there were 86.6 males.

The median income for a household in the city was $33,542, and for a family was $37,750. Males had a median income of $28,250 versus $18,333 for females. The per capita income for the city was $15,997. About 17.2% of families and 22.4% of the population were below the poverty line, including 32.5% of those under age 18 and 18.0% of those age 65 or over.

Education
Ore City is served by the Ore City Independent School District.

Notable people from Ore City
Montana Jordan, actor famous for playing the role of Georgie Cooper in the hit TV show Young Sheldon. Raised in Ore City; originally from Longview, Texas.
 Walter McAfee, physicist, mathematician, and astronomer who helped launch the Space Age through important contributions to Project Diana.
Chad Stanley , punter in the National Football League.

References

Cities in Texas
Cities in Upshur County, Texas
Longview metropolitan area, Texas